Agnolo Gaddi (c.1350–1396) was an Italian painter. He was born and died in Florence, and was the son of the painter Taddeo Gaddi,who was himself the major pupil of the Florentine master Giotto.

Agnolo was a painter and mosaicist, trained by his father, and a merchant as well; in middle age he settled down to commercial life in Venice, and he added greatly to the family wealth. He died in Florence in October 1396.

Agnolo was an influential and prolific artist who was the last major Florentine painter stylistically descended from Giotto. His paintings show much early promise, although  suggests his abilities did not progress as he advanced in life. One of the earliest works, at San Jacopo tra i Fossi, Florence, represents the "Resurrection of Lazarus." Another probably youthful performance is the series of frescoes of the Prato Cathedral—legends of the Virgin and of her Sacred Girdle; the "Marriage of Mary" is one of the best of this series, the later compositions in which have suffered much by renewals. In Santa Croce, Florence he painted, in eight frescoes, the legend of the Cross, beginning with the archangel Michael giving Seth a branch from the Tree of Knowledge, and ending with the emperor Heraclius carrying the Cross as he enters Jerusalem; in this picture is a portrait of the painter himself.

Among his pupils was the author of an art treatise, Cennino Cennini, who mentions him in the book.

Giorgio Vasari included a biography of Agnolo Gaddi in his Lives of the Most Excellent Painters, Sculptors, and Architects.

Paintings
 Enthroned Madonna and Child with Saints (c. 1375) tempera on panel at Galleria nazionale di Parma
 Madonna and Child with Saints Andrew, Benedict, Bernard, and Catherine of Alexandria with Angels (before 1387), tempera on panel, National Gallery of Art, Andrew W. Mellon Collection, Washington, D.C.. Triptych, possibly commissioned for a Cistercian monastery.
 Legend of the True Cross (1385-1387), frescoe cycle in the choir of Santa Croce, Florence
 Madonna and Child with Saint John the Evangelist, Saint John the Baptist, Saint James of Compostela and Saint Nicholas of Bari (1388-1390), tempera on panel, National Gallery of Victoria
 Coronation of the Virgin with Six Angels (c. 1390), tempera on panel, National Gallery of Art, Samuel H. Kress Collection, Washington, D.C.. This painting is probably the central panel of an altarpiece, possibly from the church of San Giovanni dei Fieri, Pisa.
 The Crucifixion (c. 1390) tempera and gold on panel. Thyssen-Bornemisza Museum, Madrid
 Madonna of Humility with Angels (mid 1390s), tempera on panel, Cummer Museum of Art and Gardens, Jacksonville, Florida
 Madonna and Child with Angels and Saints, tempera on panel, Palazzo Blu collection
 Crucifixion (1390s), tempera on panel. Part of a polyptych. Galleria degli Uffizi, Florence.
 Histories of the Virgin and the Cintola, Prato Cathedral

Gallery

References

External links
 
National Gallery of Art, Biography
Agnolo Gaddi
Italian Paintings: Florentine School, a collection catalog containing information about Gaddi and his works (see pages: 46–49).

14th-century Italian painters
Italian male painters
Trecento painters
Painters from Florence
Gothic painters
1350 births
1396 deaths
Agnolo
Catholic painters